Brittany Brewer (born November 6, 1997) is an American professional basketball player. She played in college for the Texas Tech Lady Raiders of the Big 12 Conference. Brewer is the 2020 CoSIDA Academic All-American of the Year. She was also selected as a First-team Academic All-American in 2019.

College career
Brewer started 17 games in each of her freshman and sophomore seasons with the Lady Raiders. In the 2018–19 season, she started all 31 games as a junior and added 3-point shootings to her repertoire; averaging 34.3% on 99 attempts while attempting none in her prior two years. In the 2019–20 season, Brewer once again started all 29 games as a senior and averaged a double-double of 16.6 ppg and 10.3 rpg.

During her senior year, she also tied the NCAA Division I women's single-game record for blocked shots, recording 16 as part of a triple-double in the Lady Raiders' 83–38 rout of Louisiana–Monroe on December 22, 2019.

Professional career
Brewer was selected with the fifth pick in the second round, 17th overall, of the 2020 WNBA draft by the Atlanta Dream.

Career statistics

College

|-
| style="text-align:left; | 2016–17
| style="text-align:left;"| Texas Tech
| 31 || 17 || 22.3 || .452 || .000 || .604 || 5.7 || 0.5 || 0.2 || 1.7 || 1.5 || 5.8
|-
| style="text-align:left;"| 2017–18
| style="text-align:left;"| Texas Tech
| 30 || 17 || 20.2 || .490 || .000 || .531 || 5.0 || 0.8 || 0.4 || 1.3 || 2.4 || 9.5
|-
| style="text-align:left;"| 2018–19
| style="text-align:left;"| Texas Tech
| 31 || 31 || 31.0 || .528 || .343 || .692 || 9.1 || 1.2 || 0.7 || 2.3 || 2.5 || 16.6
|-
| style="text-align:left;"| 2019–20*
| style="text-align:left;"| Texas Tech
| 29 || 29 || 31.5 || .509 || .243 || .675 || 10.3 || 0.9 || 0.7 || 4.4 || 2.5 || 16.6
|- class="sortbottom"
| style="text-align:center;" colspan="2"| Career
| 121 || 94 || 26.2 || .495 || .146 || .625 || 7.5 || 0.7 || 0.5 || 2.4 || 2.3 || 12.1

* 2020 NCAA tournament cancelled due to coronavirus disease pandemic
Source: texastech.com

WNBA

Regular season

|-
| style="text-align:left;"| 2020
| style="text-align:left;"| Atlanta
| 5 || 0 || 6.6 || .667 || – || – || 1.0 || 0.0 || 0.6 || 0.8 || 0.4 || 0.8

Source: basketball-reference.com

Personal life 
Brittany Brewer is the daughter of Jacob and Melanie Brewer. She has four siblings: Brianna, Brooklyn, Joy and Josh. Brewer majored in Community, Family and Addiction Sciences at Texas Tech.

References

1997 births
Living people
American women's basketball players
Atlanta Dream draft picks
Atlanta Dream players
Basketball players at the 2019 Pan American Games
Basketball players from Texas
Pan American Games medalists in basketball
Pan American Games silver medalists for the United States
Power forwards (basketball)
Sportspeople from Abilene, Texas
Texas Tech Lady Raiders basketball players
Medalists at the 2019 Pan American Games